The Renault Centre (or the Renault Distribution Centre) is a high tech building in Swindon commissioned by the French car company Renault for their UK operations. Designed by the British architect Norman Foster of Foster Associates, it opened in 1982 and Renault moved out in 2001.

Since 2001 the building has been known as The Spectrum Building. It was listed Grade II* by English Heritage in 2013.

Design

The architecture expressed not only the corporate ownership with the yellow of Renault used on all the structural elements, but also promoted a modern statement on industrial relations by using the same roof over the warehouse and office elements, making no distinction between white- and blue-collar workers.

The structural engineer was Ove Arup & Partners. The cable stayed steel structural system provides a 24m column clear zone, with the columns of only 450mm diameter.

Renault commissioned the building in 1980 after outgrowing their premises in Reading. Planning permission was granted in June 1981, construction commenced July 1981 and practical completion was achieved in December 1982.

The building won several awards in 1984 including the British Constructional Steelwork Association's Structural Steel Award, Civic Trust Award and Financial Times 'Architecture at Work' Award. It also won Private Eye's Sir Hugh Casson Award for the worst new building of the year.

References

External links
 
 
 
 

High-tech architecture
Foster and Partners buildings
Grade II* listed buildings in Wiltshire
Buildings and structures in Swindon
Recipients of Civic Trust Awards
1982 establishments in England